The Savage Bees is a 1976 American natural horror television film directed and produced by Bruce Geller and written by Guerdon Trueblood. The film stars Ben Johnson, Michael Parks, Paul Hecht, Gretchen Corbett, and Horst Buchholz. It follows a swarm of killer bees threatening people during Mardi Gras in New Orleans.

Cast
 Ben Johnson as Sheriff Donald McKew
 Michael Parks as Dr. Jeff DuRand
 Paul Hecht as Dr. Rufus Carter
 Gretchen Corbett as Jeannie Devereaux
 Horst Buchholz as Dr. Jorge Meuller
 Bruce French as Police Lieutenant
 James Best as Pelligrino
 David L. Gray as Coast Guard Lieutenant
 Richard Charles Boyle as Coast Guard Chief
 Eliott Keener as Freighter Boatswain
 Boardman O'Connor as Freighter Captain
 Danny Barker as Taxicab Driver
 Don Hood as Deputy Churn
 Bill Holliday as Deputy Stilt
 Carol Sutton as Mrs. Compher
 Tiffany Gautier Chase as Julie Compher
 Shirl Cieutat as Mrs. Bryant

Release
The Savage Bees premiered on NBC in the United States on November 22, 1976, as part of Monday Night at the Movies. The film was theatrically released in the United Kingdom by Columbia-Warner Distributors on April 23, 1978.

Awards and nominations

Sequel
A sequel, titled Terror Out of the Sky, was directed by Lee H. Katzin and written by Guerdon Trueblood and Doris Silverton. It premiered on CBS in the United States on December 26, 1978.

Cast
 Efrem Zimbalist Jr. as David Martin
 Dan Haggerty as Nick Willis
 Tovah Feldshuh as Jeannie Devereux
 Lonny Chapman as Earl Logan
 Ike Eisenmann as Eric Mangus
 Joe E. Tata as Groves
 Richard Herd as Col. Mangus
 Charles Hallahan as Tibbles Sr.
 Bruce French as Eli Nathanson
 Steve Franken as Paul Gladstone

References

External links
 

1976 films
1976 horror films
1976 television films
1970s horror thriller films
1970s English-language films
American horror television films
American horror thriller films
American natural horror films
Films about bees
Films set in New Orleans
Films shot in New Orleans
Mardi Gras in New Orleans
NBC network original films
1970s American films